KKZU (101.7 FM, "The Zoo") is a radio station licensed to Sayre, Oklahoma. The station broadcasts a classic rock format and is owned by Wright Broadcasting Systems, Inc.

References

External links
KKZU's official website

KZU
Classic rock radio stations in the United States